Juan Quirós Segura (born 25 February 1956) is a Spanish professional golfer.

Quirós was born in La Linea, Andalusia. He played on the European Tour most seasons from 1983 to 2000, making the top one hundred on the Order of Merit three times. His best tournament finish was as joint runner-up in the 1994 Turespana Open de Tenerife.

On fifty in early 2006, Quirós joined the European Seniors Tour, and he won that year's Bad Ragaz PGA Seniors Open by two strokes. He followed that by winning the 2007 French Senior Open and 2008 Irish Seniors Open.

Professional wins (19)

Challenge Tour wins (1)

Other wins (13)
1988 Larios Open
1994 Neguri Open
1996 II Torneo Circuito Nacional Profesional, III Torneo Circuito Nacional Profesional, 
1997 III Torneo Circuito Nacional Profesional
1998 VI Torneo Circuito Profesional RFEG/APG
2000 Campeonato de España A.P.G., Campeonato Cataluña de Profesionales
2001 Campeonato Peugeot OKI de Vigo, Campeonato Peugeot OKI de Málaga, Peugeot OKI Pro-Am Gran Final
2003 Campeonato OKI Pro-Am
2004 Campeonato Peugeot Oliva

European Senior Tour wins (4)

European Senior Tour playoff record (1–0)

Other senior wins (1)
2008 Campeonato de Andalucía de Profesionales

External links
 

Spanish male golfers
European Tour golfers
European Senior Tour golfers
Sportspeople from La Línea de la Concepción
1956 births
Living people
20th-century Spanish people
21st-century Spanish people